Cleocnemis is a genus of South American running crab spiders that was first described by Eugène Louis Simon in 1886.

Species
 it contains eight species, found only in South America:
Cleocnemis heteropoda Simon, 1886 (type) – Brazil
Cleocnemis insignis (Mello-Leitão, 1929) – Brazil
Cleocnemis lanceolata Mello-Leitão, 1929 – Brazil
Cleocnemis magna (Mello-Leitão, 1929) – Brazil
Cleocnemis mutilata (Mello-Leitão, 1917) – Brazil
Cleocnemis querencia (Lise & Silva, 2011) – Brazil
Cleocnemis robertae (Lise & Silva, 2011) – Brazil, Argentina
Cleocnemis zabele (Pantoja, Drago-Bisneto & Saturnino, 2020) – Brazil

See also
 List of Philodromidae species

References

Araneomorphae genera
Philodromidae
Spiders of South America